Malva Schalek, aka Malvina Schalková (18 February 1882 – 24 May 1944 or 24 March 1945), was a Czech-Jewish painter. Trained in Prague, she went on to work in Vienna as a painter. From 1942 to 1944 she was imprisoned in the Theresienstadt concentration camp. In 1944 she was moved to the Auschwitz concentration camp, where she died. Many of her works are held in the Ghetto Fighters' House in Israel.

Life
Malva Schalek was born in Prague to a German-speaking Jewish intellectual family active in the Czech national movement. She went to school in Prague, Vrchlabi (Hohenelbe), and studied art, first at the Frauenakademie in Munich and then privately in Vienna. She earned her living as a painter in Vienna, in her studio above the Theater an der Wien, until July 1938, when she was forced to flee from the Nazis, leaving her paintings behind. Only some 30 works from this period have been recovered; two were found in the Historisches Zentrum von Wien.

Schalek was deported to the Terezin (Theresienstadt) ghetto in February 1942, where she produced more than 100 drawings and watercolors portraying fellow inmates and their life there. Because of her refusal to portray a collaborationist doctor, she was deported to Auschwitz on 18 May 1944, where she died.

Work

Her work, especially her drawings of the camp at Theresienstadt, is characterized by a sober realism. These drawings have been described by Tom L. Freudenheim, director of the Baltimore Museum of Art, as  "perhaps the finest and most complete artistic oeuvre to survive the Holocaust."  Recovered after the liberation, most are in the art collection of the Ghetto Fighters' House museum at kibbutz Lohamei HaGeta'ot in Israel.

References

 Spiritual Resistance: Art from Concentration Camps, 1940-1945: a Selection of Drawings and Paintings from the Collection of Kibbutz Lohamei Haghetaot, Israel, with essays by Miriam Novitch, Lucy S. Dawidowicz, and Tom L. Freudenheim. Union of American Hebrew Congregations, Jewish Publication Society of America, Baltimore Museum of Art, 1981 , 9780807401576
 Heinrich Fuchs, Die österreichischen Maler der Geburtsjahrgänge 1881-1900. Heinrich Fuchs, Selbstverl., 1977
 Pnina Rosenberg, Images and Reflections: Women in the Art of the Holocaust (exhibition catalogue) Israel: Beit Lohamei Haghetaot, Spring 2002
 Catherine Stodolsky, Die gebürtige Pragerin Malvina Schalek. Theresienstädter Studien und Dokumente 10 (2003): 145-161.

External links
 Malva Schalek page
 Nizza Thobi on Malva Schalek

1882 births
1944 deaths
Artists from Prague
Czech Jews who died in the Holocaust
Czech people who died in Auschwitz concentration camp
Jewish painters
Czech painters
Czech women painters
Theresienstadt Ghetto prisoners
Czechoslovak civilians killed in World War II
20th-century Czech women artists
Jewish women artists